Widi is a village in Burkina Faso.

Widi or WIDI may refer to:

 WiDi, wireless display technology by Intel
 WIDI, a radio station

See also
 Widi language (disambiguation)
 Wide-Eye, a British animated children's TV Series
 WEDI (disambiguation)